Ifri n'Amr Ou Moussa is an archaeological site discovered in 2005, located in the rural commune of Aït Siberne, Khémisset Province, in Western Morocco. This site has revealed burials associated with both Moroccan Early Neolithic and Bell Beaker culture.

Genetics

 examined the remains of 7 seven individuals buried at Ifri N'Amr Ou Moussa c. 5325-4786 BC. The 2 samples of Y-DNA extracted belonged to the paternal haplogroup E-L19*, while the 5 samples of mtDNA extracted belonged to the maternal haplogroups M1b1*, U6a1b (two samples), U6a7b2 and U6a3. The paternal haplogroup E-L19* is very common in North Africa. The maternal haplogroups are associated with migrations from Eurasia into North Africa during the Upper Paleolithic. They were found to be closely related to Stone Age people buried at Taforalt, Morocco c. 15000 BC. Both the Taforalt and Ifri N'Amr ou Moussa people were found to be related to people of the Natufian culture (c. 9000 BC) and Pre-Pottery Neolithic (c. 6500 BC) of the Levant, with whom they appeared to share a common origine. Genetic continuity with the Taforalt suggested that the ancestors of the Ifri n'Amr ou Moussa people had adopted a Neolithic lifestyle without substantial migration. Among modern populations, the examined individuals were determined to be most closely related to the Mozabite people. Individuals examined at the Late Neolithic site of Kelif el Boroud, Morocco (c. 3000 BC), carried about 50% Early European Farmer (EEF) ancestry, suggesting substantial migration of Cardial Ware people from Iberia into North Africa during the Neolithic. People buried at Ifri n'Amr ou Moussa and Kelif el Boroud carried a much lower amount of sub-Saharan African admixture than modern North Africans, suggesting that trans-Saharan migrations occurred after Neolithic times. They carried lower sub-Saharan African admixture than Stone Age people of Taforalt as well. The Ifri n'Amr ou Moussa people were determined to have had dark skin and dark eye color. The Guanches of the Canary Islands were modeled as a mixture of ancestry from Ifri N'Amr ou Moussa and Kelif el Boroud.

See also
Mechta-Afalou
Kelif el Boroud
Taforalt

References

Sources

 

2005 archaeological discoveries
Archaeological sites in Morocco
6th-millennium BC establishments